Shōgun is an upcoming American period drama television limited series based on the 1975 novel of the same name by James Clavell that is set to premiere on FX on Hulu.

Premise
Shōgun follows "the collision of two ambitious men from different worlds and a mysterious female samurai: John Blackthorne, a risk-taking English sailor who ends up shipwrecked in Japan, a land whose unfamiliar culture will ultimately redefine him; Lord Toranaga, a shrewd, powerful daimyo, at odds with his own dangerous, political rivals; and Lady Mariko, a woman with invaluable skills but dishonorable family ties, who must prove her value and allegiance".

Cast
 Cosmo Jarvis as John Blackthorne
 Hiroyuki Sanada as Lord Toranaga
 Anna Sawai as Lady Mariko
 Tadanobu Asano as Kashigi Yabushige
 Fumi Nikaido as Ochiba No Kata
 Tokuma Nishioka as Toda Hiromatsu
 Takehiro Hira as Ishido Kazunari
 Ako as Daiyoin Lady Iyo
 Shinnosuke Abe as Toda Hiroshige "Buntaro
 Yasunari Takeshima as Muraji
 Hiroto Kanai as Koshigi Omi
 Toshi Toda as Sugiyama
 Hiro Kanagawa as Igarashi
 Néstor Carbonell as Father Rodrigues
 Yuki Kura as Yoshii Nagakado
 Tommy Bastow as Father Martin Alvito
 Moeka Hoshi as Usami Fuji
 Yoriko Dōguchi as Kiri No Kata
 Yuka Kouri as Kiku
 Yuki Kedoin as Takemaru
Gerard Butler as Portuguese Priest
Mako Fujimoto as Shizu No Kata

Production

Development
During the Television Critics Association's annual summer press tour in August 2018, FX announced to make a new adaptation of Shogun and had given the production a straight-to-series order. Executive producers were expected to include Andrew Macdonald, Allon Reich, Michael De Luca, Michaela Clavell, Tim Van Patten, Eugene Kelly, and Ronan Bennett. Rachel Bennette is set as a supervising producer, Tom Winchester as a producer, Georgina Pope as a co-producer, and Eriko Miyagawa as an associate producer. Patten will also direct for the series as Bennett will also write. FX Productions and DNA Television are slated to serve as production companies for the series. Sanada serves as a Producer. The 10-episode limited series is produced by FX Productions.

Filming
Principal photography for the series was scheduled to commence in March 2019 in Japan and the United Kingdom, but was delayed because the network felt that the production wasn't in good enough shape and that they wanted to aim higher. In January 2020, it was revealed that after original writer Ronan Bennett was no longer available to keep working on scripts, they started over from scratch with new writer and executive producer Justin Marks, working alongside his wife, supervising producer Rachel Kondo. The series’ writing team also includes co-executive producer Shannon Goss, consulting producer Matt Lambert, script editor Maegan Houang and staff writer Emily Yoshida. Principal photography for the series began on September 22, 2021, in Vancouver, and lasted until July 2, 2022, a full two months over the expected timeframe.

References

External links

2020s American drama television miniseries
English-language television shows
Upcoming drama television series
Television series set in feudal Japan
FX Networks original programming
Television shows based on American novels
Television shows based on British novels
Television shows filmed in Vancouver
Asian Saga
Television articles with incorrect naming style
Japan in non-Japanese culture
Adaptations of works by James Clavell